There have been two Waitangi Day acts passed by the New Zealand Parliament: the Waitangi Day Act 1960 and the Waitangi Day Act 1976. Neither made 6 February (Waitangi Day) a public holiday; this was done by the New Zealand Day Act 1973. The first Waitangi Day act was a token gesture towards acknowledging the Treaty of Waitangi. The second changed the name of the day from New Zealand Day back to Waitangi Day.

Waitangi Day Act 1960

For some years before 1960, Māori, especially Ngapuhi, had campaigned for Waitangi Day to be a public holiday in recognition of the Treaty of Waitangi. The promise of a public holiday was part of Labour's 1957 election manifesto. Labour was subsequently elected as the second Labour government, but decided that New Zealand could not afford another public holiday. The Waitangi Day Act was a compromise which allowed them to claim they had kept their promise, without actually creating a holiday.

The act consisted of three clauses and established that the sixth of February would be known as Waitangi Day and 'shall be observed throughout New Zealand as a national day of thanksgiving in commemoration of the signing of the Treaty of Waitangi.'

It did not make Waitangi Day a public holiday, but allowed the Governor-General to declare it one in any region, in substitute for that region's anniversary public holiday. The act contained the English-language version of the Treaty of Waitangi as a schedule, the first time that the Treaty had appeared anywhere in New Zealand legislation.

Māori were generally disappointed by the act, and continued to press for a public holiday. The National Party opposition spent most of the debate on the act criticising the government for breaking their promise, but also felt that New Zealand could not afford another public holiday.

1963 Amendment
In 1963 the second National government amended the act to make Waitangi Day a holiday in Northland, abolishing the Auckland Anniversary Day holiday in that area.

Waitangi Day Act 1976

In 1973 the New Zealand Day Act made the day a public holiday and renamed it New Zealand Day, and also abolished the Waitangi Day Act 1960. Many Māori felt that the new name drew attention away from the Treaty of Waitangi, and campaigned for the name to be changed back. Following a change of government in 1975, the new National government passed the Waitangi Day Act 1976, which changed the name of the day back to Waitangi Day. It also gave Northland its own anniversary day holiday and included the English and Māori language versions of the Treaty of Waitangi as a schedule.

Debate on the bills

New Zealand Parliamentary Debates, vol. 325 (1960), pp. 2949–3132.
New Zealand Parliamentary Debates, vol. 404 (1976), pp. 1367–79.
New Zealand Parliamentary Debates, vol. 405 (1976), pp. 2272–9.
New Zealand Parliamentary Debates, vol. 407 (1976), pp. 3215, 3424.

See also
Public holidays in New Zealand
Waitangi Day
Treaty of Waitangi

External links
 A history of Waitangi Day from NZHistory.net.nz
 Text of the 1976 act

Statutes of New Zealand
Treaty of Waitangi
Māori politics
1960 in New Zealand law
1976 in New Zealand law